Dalia Juknevičiūtė  (1935–1975) was a Lithuanian painter.

See also
List of Lithuanian painters

References
Universal Lithuanian Encyclopedia

1935 births
1975 deaths
20th-century Lithuanian painters